The 1966 Gallaher 500 was an endurance motor race for production cars, held on 2 October 1966 at the Mount Panorama Circuit just outside Bathurst, New South Wales in Australia. It was the seventh running of the Bathurst 500 race and the first time that the event had been staged under the Gallaher 500 name. 250 examples of a particular model had to be registered for a vehicle to be eligible for the race, up from the 100 examples required in previous years.

The race was dominated by the Morris Cooper S. It was won by the BMC entered example of Finnish rally star Rauno Aaltonen and experienced Australian Mini racer Bob Holden a lap ahead of Fred Gibson and Bill Stanley, leading home a flotilla of Cooper Ss that filled the first nine outright race positions. The best non-Mini was a Chrysler Valiant, some six laps behind Aaltonen and Holden in tenth position.

Class structure
Cars competed in four classes based on the purchase price of the vehicle in Australian dollars.

Class A
The Up to $1,800 class was contested by Datsun 1300, Fiat 850, 1.2 litre Ford Cortina, Morris Mini De Luxe and Morris 850.

Class B
The $1,801 to $2,040 class featured 1.5 litre Ford Cortina, Hillman Minx, Isuzu Bellett, Morris Cooper, Prince Skyline, Renault R8 and Toyota Corona.

Class C
The $2,041 to $2,700 class entry list was dominated by the Morris Cooper S, but also included a Fiat 1500, and a Toyota Crown.

Class D
The $2,701 to $4,000 class featured Chrysler Valiant, Holden HD X2, Studebaker Lark, Triumph 2000 and Volvo 122S.

Results

Statistics
 Fastest Lap - #21 Frank Matich - 3:10 (lap record)
 Average Speed - 112 km/h
 Race Time - 7:11:29.1

References

Further reading

External links
 Race results at www.uniquecarsandparts.com.au
 Race images at www.autopics.com.au

Motorsport in Bathurst, New South Wales
Gallaher 500